Intruder in the Dust  is a 1948 crime novel written by American author William Faulkner. Taking place in Mississippi, it revolves around an African American farmer accused of murdering a Caucasian man.

Overview
The novel focuses on Lucas Beauchamp, a black farmer accused of murdering a white man. He is exonerated through the efforts of black and white teenagers and a spinster from a long-established Southern family. It was written as Faulkner's response as a Southern writer to the racial problems facing the South.    

Intruder in the Dust is notable for its use of stream of consciousness style of narration. The novel also includes lengthy passages on the Southern memory of the Civil War, one of which Shelby Foote quoted in Ken Burns' documentary The Civil War.

The characters of Lucas Beauchamp and his wife, Molly, first appeared in Faulkner's collection of short fiction, Go Down, Moses. A story by Faulkner, "Lucas Beauchamp," was published in 1999.

The character Gavin Stevens appears as a protagonist in Faulkner's short story collection Knight's Gambit (1949).

Intruder in the Dust was turned into a film of the same name directed by Clarence Brown in 1949 after MGM paid film rights of $50,000 to Faulkner. The film was shot in Faulkner's home town of Oxford, Mississippi. In 1950, Faulkner was awarded the Nobel Prize for Literature for "his powerful and artistically unique contribution to the modern American novel." The Nobel Prize was not specifically for his novel Intruder in the Dust but for the enduring contribution of his writing as a whole.

Analysis
In her contemporary review of the novel, Eudora Welty noted its humor.  In a 1949 contemporary analysis of Faulkner's work, Dayton Kohler noted the particular feature of Intruder in the Dust of its dramatization of the hope of regeneration of the American Southern conscience, with respect to the position of black Americans in Southern American society.  John E. Bassett has commented that this novel represents a "serious attempt to explore contemporary Southern racism through Gavin and Chick."  Jean E. Graham has discussed the contrasting rhetorical styles of Gavin and Chick throughout the course of the novel.  Ticien Marie Sassoubre has examined the novel in the context of the social issues related to lynching in the American South, and then-recent American federal law with respect to black Americans.

D. Hutchinson has elucidated the unifying literary devices of the novel.  Peter J. Rabinowitz has specifically looked at Faulkner's treatment of the form of the detective story, in the context of the genre of the "discovery novel," in Intruder in the Dust.

References

External links
 
 John Anderson page on William Faulkner
 Laurel Longe's article Lucas Beauchamp, Joe Christmas, and the Color of Humanity
Intruder in the Dust at Digital Yoknapatawpha

1948 American novels
American crime novels
American novels adapted into films
Novels about racism
Novels by William Faulkner
Random House books